Bute House (Gaelic: Taigh Bhòid) is the official residence of the First Minister of Scotland located within Charlotte Square in Edinburgh. Alongside two other personal offices at the Scottish Parliament Building and St. Andrew's House, Bute House also contains a smaller office used by the First Minister when in official residence.

Located at 6 Charlotte Square in the New Town, it is the central house on the north side of the square, and was designed by Robert Adam. Bute House was conveyed to the National Trust for Scotland by the Marquess of Bute in 1966. Between 1970 and 1999 it served as the official residence of the Secretary of State for Scotland. Since July 1999, it has been the official residence of the First Minister.

The four-storey house contains the Cabinet Room, offices and conference, reception, sitting and dining rooms where the First Minister works, and where Scottish Government ministers, official visitors and guests are received and entertained. The second and third floors contain the private residence of the First Minister. As well as serving as the official residence of the First Minister, Bute House is frequently used by the First Minister to hold press conferences, media briefings, meetings of the cabinet of the Scottish Government and appointing members to the Scottish Cabinet.

History of the building

Early occupants 

Charlotte Square was designed by Scottish architect Robert Adam. The Lord Provost and Edinburgh Town Council commissioned Adam to draw up plans for the square in 1791 as the culmination of Edinburgh's first New Town. However, Adam died in 1792 and his completed designs had to be realised by others. The north side of the square was built first and is faithful to his intentions.

The plot where Bute House now stands was sold in 1792 by public roup (auction) to Orlando Hart, a shoemaker, prominent member of the Town Council and deacon-convener of the trades in Edinburgh, for £290. 

The house was occupied by John Innes Crawford who lived there between 1796 and 1800.  He was born in Jamaica on 27 October 1776.  In 1781 he inherited the Bellfield estate in St James, Jamaica from his father John Crawford.  The Bellfield sugar plantation with its six hundred enslaved workers generated a net income of £3,000 a year. He later moved to 91 George Street, Edinburgh where he lived between 1801 and 1825.  He died on 22 November 1839. 

In 1806, Sir John Sinclair, 1st Baronet bought the newly completed house for £2,950. Sinclair was a Whig politician and a writer on finance and agriculture. He was also responsible for the compilation of the First Statistical Account of Scotland. Sinclair sold the house in 1816 to Lieutenant Colonel William Gabriel Davy.

In May 1818, the house was purchased from Davy by Henry Ritchie of Busbie. Ritchie was a Glasgow merchant, a partner in the Thistle Bank, and the owner of landed estates in Lanarkshire and Ayrshire. He sold his Charlotte Square townhouse to Charles Oman, a hotel keeper and vintner, in May 1825. Oman, a native of Caithness, had owned various hotels and coffee houses in Edinburgh over the decades, including the Waterloo Hotel on the city's Waterloo Place, up until his purchase of 6 Charlotte Square. Oman turned his new townhouse into Oman's Hotel, which it was to remain for over 20 years. The fixings for the letters of the hotel's name can still be seen today on the exterior wall above the front entrance door of Bute House.

Oman died in August 1826, but the hotel continued to operate under the ownership of his widow, Mrs Grace Oman (née Burns). The exiled Charles X of France stayed at the hotel for a brief time in 1832, during his second period of exile in Edinburgh. Following Mrs Oman's death in 1845, 6 Charlotte Square was sold by her heirs to Alexander Campbell of Cammo, who lived in the house with his family until his death in 1887. Campbell commissioned David Rhind to make various alterations and additions to the house in 1867. The next owner of the house was Sir Mitchell Mitchell-Thomson, 1st Baronet, who was to make it his home for the next 30 years. A partner in his family's timber business, and a director of the Bank of Scotland, he also served as the Lord Provost of Edinburgh from 1897 until 1900. In 1889, Mitchell-Thomson employed the architect Thomas Leadbetter to carry out further alterations.

Bute family: 1922–66 

The 4th Marquess of Bute had a particular enthusiasm for the amenity value of the Scottish townscape, and from the early 1900s onwards he began to buy up the central houses on the north side of Charlotte Square, with the intention of restoring Adam's original design, which had been compromised by 19th-century intrusions, including dormer windows and alterations to the proportions of the first-floor windows. Lord Bute acquired the house at No. 5 first, in 1903, and thoroughly restored its interior in an Adam Revival style, furnishing the principal rooms with antique furniture so that it could function as the Butes' town house in Edinburgh. He subsequently acquired No. 6 in 1922 and No. 7 in 1927. Lord Bute's enthusiasm for Charlotte Square was given permanent expression when the City of Edinburgh invoked the Town Planning (Scotland) Act 1925 to effect the Edinburgh Town Planning (Charlotte Square) Scheme Order, 1930. The Bute family thereafter moved from the house at No. 5 to the neighbouring property at No. 6, taking many of the contents of No. 5 with them.

Transfer to the National Trust for Scotland 
In May 1966 the Treasury accepted Nos. 5, 6 and 7 Charlotte Square in lieu of part payment of death duties on the estate of the 5th Marquess of Bute, who had died in August 1956. The three houses became the property of the National Trust for Scotland, which proposed to lease No. 6 to a new trust which would administer the house as an official residence for the Secretary of State for Scotland, as a building where he could reside when in Edinburgh and where distinguished visitors could be received and entertained. The Bute House Trust was formed in 1966 to bring this idea to fruition. The Trustees raised the £40,000 required for the alteration and redecoration of the house and its furnishings. The interior decoration and colour schemes were the responsibility of Lady Victoria Wemyss and Colin McWilliam. Because funding was tight, the interior refurbishment of Bute House was dependent on a number of loans.

Bute House is not owned by the Scottish Government, but remains in the ownership of the National Trust for Scotland, a charitable organisation dedicated to the preservation of historic buildings and sites of natural significance across the country. The property is also legally under the supervision of the Bute House Trustees, a group whose existence was provided for in the original trust deed passing ownership from the Bute family.

Official residence 
From 1970 onwards, after the House was refurbished after its previous owners had given it and two adjoining houses to the National Trust for Scotland, Bute House became the grace-and-favour residence in Edinburgh of the Secretary of State for Scotland, the UK government minister charged with looking after Scotland's interests in Westminster, who remained as resident in it until devolution in 1999. It is now the setting for the weekly meeting of the Scottish Government's Cabinet, which meets in what used to be the Secretary of State's study.

Willie Ross was the first Secretary of State for Scotland to occupy Bute House in May 1966. The Secretary of State for Scotland ceased the ability to reside in Bute House in 1999 following the establishment of the office of First Minister of Scotland. In 1999, Donald Dewar became the first First Minister of Scotland, and first occupant of Bute House in the office of First Minister. Dewar died whilst in office in October 2000, and since then, Bute House has been occupied by successive first ministers; Henry McLeish (2000–2001), Jack McConnell (2001–2007), Alex Salmond (2007–2014) and Nicola Sturgeon (2014–present). A portrait of each of the first ministers are currently on display in the main staircase of Bute House.

Repairs and restoration

In 2017, following extensive survey work on the condition of the building undertaken by the building's conservators, Bute House was closed for urgent repairs, with the First Minister having to decant the building until necessary work was completed. The work to Bute House was co-ordinated by Historic Environment Scotland, with "temporary measures" put in place for the First Minister to reside and for meetings of the Cabinet whilst the building was being restored.

Rooms and features

Front door and vestibule 

Bute House is unusual for an Edinburgh New Town house, in that it has a central front door. The main entrance door for most New Town houses would more normally be placed on the same side as the staircase. However, the central door of Bute House was a necessary function of Adam's palace front. The wide, four-panelled entrance door is made of polished black oak. Between the top sets of panels are the brass Roman numerals "VI". Below the numerals, between the bottom sets of panels, there is a brass letter box on the left-hand side of the door, and a brass door knocker on the right-hand side. The door is framed by small side windows and adorned with a semicircular fanlight window. A black ironwork fence runs along the front of the house and up each side of the flight of six steps leading up to the entrance door. The fence rises on either side of the front step to support iron gas lamps.

As the vestibule does not open directly into the stairwell, Balfour Paul sought to ensure that it would not appear dark and forbidding by deciding to greet the visitor with a welcoming central chimneypiece in white marble facing the front door. The plan of the vestibule is T-shaped, with archways leading through from the right-hand and left-hand sides of the fireplace. The vestibule features a rosetted ceiling, highly decorative plasterwork in the Adam Revival style, and a floor of polished flagstones in octagons and black squares.

Drawing room 

The room features original elaborate ceiling plasterwork, with the frieze repeating the same festoons found in the ceiling decoration. In 1923, Lord Bute and Balfour Paul complemented this ceiling by introducing new doorcases in the same Adam style, together with an inlaid chimneypiece with a central tablet depicting Venus and Cupid and vases carried by dolphins. The new single-leafed doors replaced 19th-century double doors, which connected this large drawing room at the front of Bute House, to the back drawing room that is now the cabinet room. The fine gilded rococo mirror is attributed to the London cabinet-maker John Mackie. The 18th-century mirror was originally made for the drawing room of Duff House in Banffshire.

Cabinet room 

When Bute House was first furnished as an official residence in 1970, this room was intended as the Library or private study of the Secretary of State. With the establishment of the Scottish Government in 1999, it became the cabinet room. The original appearance of the room, with its robust colour scheme picking up the brown marble of the chimneypiece, is recorded in Harry More Gordon's conversation piece portraying all the successive Secretaries of State for Scotland. This room retains its original cornice but the chimneypiece and the shaped treatment of the south wall, which replaces the 19th-century double folding doors that led into the front drawing room, were introduced in the 1920s by Lord Bute and Balfour Paul.
Colin McWilliam designed a desk and a bookcase incorporating copies of the portrait medallion of Robert Adam by James Tassie, for this room. The modern reproduction Georgian ladder back chairs were intended to complement the existing suite of dining chairs at Bute House. The chandelier was originally in the Butes’ dining room on the ground floor.

The dining room 
In 1967, the Bute House Trust commissioned the reproduction furniture in this room: the chairs are from Whytock and Reid.

Security and incidents

In 2002, a drunken woman was able to enter Bute House and attend a private function that was taking place within Bute House. During this incident, neither then-First Minister Jack McConnell nor his wife were in residence at Bute House.

In 2004, it was reported, incorrectly, that a bomb had been found close to Bute House whilst McConnell was serving as First Minister. After an investigation, it was concluded that the suspect was indeed carrying nothing that could be deemed harmful, and was later sectioned under the Mental Health Act.

In 2016, a man walked up to the front door of Bute House and began to shout abuse, asking if Nicola Sturgeon was inside the building. Sturgeon was not in residence at Bute House during this incident, but the man was later found guilty of two charges of breach of the peace.

As a result of further restrictions to tackle rising COVID-19 cases in Scotland, 70 protesters gathered outside Bute House to protest against further restrictions in Scotland, claiming that it was a "conspiracy theory". Four men were later arrested for breaking the coronavirus lockdown restrictions that were currently in place within the Edinburgh area at the time of the protest.

Notes

References 
 
 Gifford, John; McWilliam, Colin & Walker, David (1984). Edinburgh: The Buildings of Scotland. (Pevsner Architectural Guides.) New Haven: Yale University Press. .
 Paton, Hugh (1842). A Series of Original Portraits and Caricature Etchings by the late John Kay. Edinburgh: Hugh Paton.
 Youngson, A. J. (2001). The Companion Guide to Edinburgh and the Borders. Companion Guides. .

External links 

 Office of the First Minister of Scotland
 The Scottish Government
History at Random Blog: The History of Bute House – Home to the First Minister of Scotland

Houses completed in 1805
Category A listed buildings in Edinburgh
Government buildings in Edinburgh
New Town, Edinburgh
19th century in Scotland
Official residences in the United Kingdom
Government buildings in Scotland
Listed houses in Scotland
Listed government buildings in Scotland
1805 establishments in Scotland
National Trust for Scotland properties